Nathaniel Adams (born March 29, 1984) is an American professional freestyle motocross rider and extreme sports athlete. A resident of  Temecula, California, he attained national fame when he won the Freestyle Motocross World Championship in 2002. His nicknames are "The Destroyer" and "Nate Dog".

Biography 
Adams was born in Phoenix, Arizona, and began riding when he was eight years old after his father bought him his first dirtbike. He graduated from Mountain Ridge High School in Glendale, Arizona, in 2002. While successful in local and regional circuits, he became well known in freestyle motocross by winning his first freestyle championship at age eighteen in 2002. Since then, Adams has won the gold medal at the X Games in 2004, the Gravity Games in 2003, and has enjoyed top finishes on the Vans Triple Crown.  In 2007, Adams was awarded AST Dew Tour Athlete of the Year. In 2009, Adams became the Red Bull X-Fighters champion, clinching the title at London's Battersea Power Station. He also retained the title the following year, becoming the first rider to win double championships, and also the first rider to win back-to-back championships. He is a born-again Christian.

Some of Adams's current and past sponsors include: DC Shoes, Monster Energy, Target Corporation, Butterfinger, Yamaha Motor Company, Deft Family, Honda Racing Corporation, Dragon Optics, Alpinestars and One Industries.

References

External links 

Interview on wasserwerfer.de

1984 births
Living people
Sportspeople from Phoenix, Arizona
Sportspeople from Temecula, California
Freestyle motocross riders
American motocross riders
X Games athletes